Good Lies may refer to:

"Good Lies", song by The Notwist from The Devil, You + Me
"Good Lies", song by Mariah Carey from Caution (Mariah Carey album)
Good Lies, Season 2 Episode 5 of Step Dave

See also
The Good Lie, film